Gard Nilssen (born 24 June 1983 in Skien, Norway) is a Norwegian Jazz musician (drums) and composer, and member of the bands Bushman's Revenge and Puma.

Career 
Nilssen was educated on the Jazz program at Trondheim Musikkonservatorium (2003). He was voted this year's young jazz musicians in 2006 with the group Puma. Otherwise Nilssen is very active in bands like Bushman´s Revenge, Lord Kelvin, and Heidi Skjerve Kvintett.

Nilssen was chosen to represent Norway in the artist development program Take Five, a music developer program promoted by the London-based concert promoter Serious.

Honors 
This year's young jazz musicians 2006, with the band Puma by Rikskonsertene and Norsk Jazzforum

Discography

Solo albums 
Gard Nilssen's Acoustic Unity, including with André Roligheten and Petter Eldh
2015: Firehouse (Clean Feed Records)
2017: Live in Europe (Clean Feed Records)
2019: To Whom Who Buys a Record (Grappa Musikkforlag AS)
2022: Elastic Wave (ECM Records)

Band releases 
Within Puma trio including Øystein Moen and Stian Westerhus
2007: Isolationism (Bolage Records)
2008: Discotheque Bitpunching (Bolage Records)
2009: Fist Full of Knuckles (Knuckleman Records), with Lasse Marhaug
2010: Half Nelson Courtship (Rune Grammofon)

Within Bushman's Revenge trio including Rune Nergaard and Even Helte Hermansen
2007: Cowboy Music (Jazzaway Records)
2009: You Lost Me At Hello (Rune Grammofon)
2010: Jitterbug (Rune Grammofon)
2012: A Little Bit Of Big Bonanza (Rune Grammofon)
2012: Never Mind The Botox (Rune Grammofon)
2013: Electric Komle – Live! (Rune Grammofon)
2016: Jazz, Fritt Etter Hukommelsen (Rune Grammofon)
2016: Bushman's Fire (Rune Grammofon), live LP with Kjetil Møster and David Wallumrød

Within Lord Kelvin trio including Eirik Hegdal and Erik Johannessen
2009: Dances In The Smoke (Jazzland Recordings)
2011: Radio Has No Future (Gigafon Records)

Within Cortex quartet including Ola Høyer, Kristoffer Berre Alberts and Thomas Johansson
2011: Resection (Bolage Records)
2012: Göteborg (Gigafon Records)

Collaborations 
With Marita Røstad
2007: Silent Sunday (Magica Records)

Within Team Hegdal quartet including Eirik Hegdal, André Roligheten and Rune Nergaard
2010: Vol 1 (Øra Fonogram)
2011: Vol 2 (Øra Fonogram), sextet including additional Mattias Ståhl and Ola Kvernberg

Within Scent Of Soil quintet including Tore Brunborg, Kirsti Huke, Petter Vågan and Rune Nergaard
2011: Scent Of Soil (Hubro Music)

With Obara International
2013: Komeda (For Tune)
2013: Live At Manggha (For Tune)
2015: Live In Mińsk Mazowiecki (For Tune)

With Elvira Nikolaisen and Mathias Eick
 2013: I Concentrate On You (Grappa)

With Arild Andersen and Helge Lien
2016: The Rose Window (Deutsche Media Productions), live at Theater Gütersloh

With Maciej Obara Quartet
2017: Unloved (ECM Records)
2019: Three Crowns (ECM Records)

References 

1983 births
Living people
Musicians from Skien
20th-century Norwegian drummers
21st-century Norwegian drummers
Norwegian jazz drummers
Male drummers
Norwegian jazz composers
Avant-garde jazz musicians
Norwegian University of Science and Technology alumni
Rune Grammofon artists
Hubro Music artists
20th-century drummers
Male jazz composers
20th-century Norwegian male musicians
21st-century Norwegian male musicians
Puma (band) members
Bushman's Revenge members